Smithsonia is a genus of flowering plants from the orchid family, Orchidaceae. It contains three known species, all endemic to southern India.

Smithsonia maculata (Dalzell) C.J.Saldanha - Kanara
Smithsonia straminea C.J.Saldanha - southern India
Smithsonia viridiflora (Dalzell) C.J.Saldanha - southern India

See also
 List of Orchidaceae genera

References

External links

Orchids of India
Vandeae genera
Aeridinae